Al-Al (trans. "the high place"), is a former Syrian village in the southern Golan Heights, on the southern tributary of Wadi es-Samekh. Israel occupied the area during the Six-Day War. The village was abandoned and dismantled.

During the French Mandate for Syria and the Lebanon, the name was spelt "El Al" on French maps.

History
Archaeological remains of several Roman and Greek artifacts at the site gives evidence of ancient settlement.

In 1812, the place was described as a "ruined village". A modern village was probably established during the second half of the 19th century. In 1884 it was reported that the village contained 65 dwellings, including 320 inhabitants and was a "large, well-built village on the point of reviving".

The Israeli settlement of Eliad was built nearby.

During the Yom Kippur War, the Syrian 5th Infantry Division set up a defence in depth strategy at the Al ‘Al ridgeline.

See also
 Qasr Bardawil, archaeological site from a mountain spur near Al-‘Al, now classified as a Bronze Age fortification, but previously misidentified as the Crusader castle of al-Al
 Syrian towns and villages depopulated in the Arab-Israeli conflict

References

Destroyed towns
Former populated places on the Golan Heights
19th-century establishments in Ottoman Syria
1960s disestablishments in Syria